Kiowa Township is a township in Barber County, Kansas, USA.  As of the 2000 census, its population was 1,164.

Geography
According to the USGS, it contains one cemetery, Riverview.

Transportation
Kiowa Township contains one airport or landing strip, Kiowa Airport. Kiowa Airport is closed, it is on the west side of Kiowa. It has feed stacked on it. There are two grass private landing strips on the east side of Kiowa. One a 1/2 mile. The other 1 mile.

References
 USGS Geographic Names Information System (GNIS)

External links
 US-Counties.com
 City-Data.com

Townships in Barber County, Kansas
Townships in Kansas